The Friedenspark ("Peace Park") is an open space of about 20 hectares in the centre of Leipzig, in the district of Zentrum-Südost, located between the Ostplatz to the north and the Russian Memorial Church (Russische Gedächtniskirche) to the south. The park was opened in 1983, after the secularisation and clearance, under the then East German regime, of the Neuer Johannisfriedhof ("New St. John's Cemetery"), which is what the space used to be, and its thorough reconstruction.

Neuer Johannisfriedhof 

The site of the Friedenspark used to be occupied by the Neuer Johannisfriedhof, which was opened as the second city cemetery of Leipzig in 1846, after it had proved impossible to enlarge the old cemetery, the Alter Johannisfriedhof, any further. The designs for the chapel and mortuary, built between 1881 and 1884, were by Hugo Licht (1841–1923). They were destroyed in World War II. During the time of the National Socialist government the remains of more than a hundred children from the Paediatrics Department of the Dösen Asylum were buried anonymously in urns in sections V 2, 3 and 5, victims of the then child euthanasia policy. 

On 31 December 1950 the Neuer Johannisfriedhof was closed to further burials, but remained accessible to the public up to 31 December 1970. From 1973 to 1975 the cemetery was secularised: vaults were removed, graves cleared and levelled. About 120 monuments and gravestones of civic or art-historical significance were taken to the Alter Johannisfriedhof and kept in the open air. A combination of damage during transit, theft and vandalism meant that by the early 1990s only 58 monuments remained. These were restored, and erected in the south-east of the Alter Johannisfriedhof.

Burials of notable people 
The locations of these burials, thanks to the clearance of the cemetery, are no longer traceable, and as above most monuments have not survived.

 Wilhelm Eduard Albrecht (1800–1876), lawyer
 Ernst Anschütz (1780–1861), composer
 Adolph Ambrosius Barth (1827–1869), publisher and bookseller
 Paul Barth (1858–1922), philosopher and sociologist
 Gustav Baur (1816–1889), theologian
 Adolf Blomeyer (1830–1889), agronomist
 Julius Blüthner (1824–1910), piano builder
 Georg Bötticher (1849–1918), author, father of Joachim Ringelnatz
 Edwin Bormann (1851–1912), writer, scientist
 Friedrich Arnold Brockhaus (1772–1823), publisher 
 Heinrich Brockhaus (1804–1874), publisher, Citizen of Honour of Leipzig 
 Hermann Brockhaus (1806–1877), orientalist
 Clemens Brockhaus (1837–1877), theologian
 Lorenz Clasen (1812–1899), historical painter
 Julius Friedrich Cohnheim (1839-1884), pathologist
 Carl Hermann Credner (1842–1913), geologist
 Georg Curtius (1820–1885), philologist
 Johann Nepomuk Czermak (1828–1873), physiologist
 Ferdinand David (1810-1873), concert master of the Gewandhaus
 Otto Delitsch (1821–1882), geographer 
 Rudolf Dietsch (1814–1875), philologist
 Hans Driesch (1867–1941), biologist
 Albert Dufour-Féronce (1798–1861), entrepreneur, railway pioneer
 Gustav Heinrich Duncker (????–1882), businessman
 Peter Dybwad (1859–1921), architect
 Friedrich August Eckstein (1810-1885), philologist and pedagogue
 Gustav Theodor Fechner (1801–1887), physicist and natural philosopher, Citizen of Honour of Leipzig
 Fedor Flinzer (1832–1911), illustrator
 Emil Albert Friedberg (1837–1910), jurist
 Hermann Traugott Fritzsche (1809–1887), businessman
 Hermann Traugott Fritzsche (Junior) (1843–1906), businessman
 Otto Hermann Fritzsche (1882–1906), pioneer of flight
 Hugo Gaudig (1860–1923), reforming pedagogue
 Gustav Friedrich Hänel (1792–1878), jurist
 Moritz Hauptmann (1792–1868), composer
 Carl Heine (1819–1888), entrepreneur, industry pioneer
 Wilhelm His (1831–1904), anatomist
 Franz von Holstein (1826–1878), composer
 Hermann Joseph (1811–1869), jurist and politician
 Julius Klinkhardt (1810–1881), publisher
 Otto Koch (1810–1876), politician and Bürgermeister, Citizen of Honour of Leipzig
 Karl Franz Koehler (1843–1897), publisher and bookseller
 Karl Krause (1823–1902), machine manufacturer
 Ernst Kroker (1859–1927), librarian and historian
 Albrecht Kurzwelly (1868–1917), art historian
 Carl Lampe (1804–1889), entrepreneur, railway pioneer, Citizen of Honour of Leipzig
 Paul Lange (1853–1932), architect
 Rudolf Leuckart (1822–1898), zoologist, Citizen of Honour of Leipzig
 Jacob Bernhard Limburger (1770–1847) and family, manufacturer of silk goods
 Carl Ludwig (1816–1895), physiologist, Citizen of Honour of Leipzig
 Anton Mädler (1864–1925), manufacturer of suitcases and patron of the arts
 Gotthard Oswald Marbach (1810–1890), philosopher, poet, director of insurance
 Hermann Masius (1818–1893), pedagogue and professor
 Wilhelm Maurenbrecher (1838–1892), German historian
 Ignaz Moscheles (1794–1870), composer and pianist
 Carl Otto Müller (1819–1898), jurist
 Friedrich Konrad Müller (1823–1881), poet
 Richard Müller (????–????), conductor
 Paul Möbius (1866–1907), architect
 Oscar Mothes (1828–1903), architect
 Carl Gottfried Neumann (1832–1925), mathematician
 Adam Friedrich Oeser (1717–1799), painter
 Louise Otto-Peters (1819–1895), writer and proponent of women's rights
 Johannes Overbeck (1826–1895), archaeologist
 Oscar Paul (1836–1898), musicologist
 Eduard Friedrich Poeppig (1798–1868), biologist
 Eduard Pötzsch (1803–1889), architect
 Anton Philipp Reclam (1807–1896) and family, publisher
 Rudolph Alexander Renkwitz (1828–1910), businessman and founder
 Friedrich Ritschl (1806–1876), philologist
 Wilhelm Roscher (1817–1894), national economist and historian, Citizen of Honour of Leipzig
 Arwed Rossbach (1844–1902), architect
 Emil Adolf Rossmässler (1805–1867), nature researcher
 Christian Hermann Schellenberg (1816–1862), organist at St. Nicolai
 Adolf Heinrich Schletter (1793–1853), businessman and founder (removed to the Südfriedhof)
 Auguste Schmidt (1833–1902), teacher and proponent of women's rights
 Moritz Schreber (1808–1861), doctor
 Paul Robert Schuster (1841–1877), theologian
 Willmar Schwabe (1839–1917), homeopath, chemist and manufacturer of medicines
 Friedrich Herman Semmig (1820–1897), writer, participant in the 1849 May Uprising in Dresden
 Anton Springer (1825–1891), art historian
 Melchior zur Strassen (1832–1896), sculptor
 Konrad Sturmhoefel (1858–1916), historian and pedagogue
 Benedictus Gotthelf Teubner (1784–1856) and family, publisher
 Carl Thiersch (1822–1895), physician
 Constantin von Tischendorf (1815–1874), theologian
 Carl Bruno Tröndlin (1835–1908), Oberbürgermeister of Leipzig
 Heinrich Gottlieb Tzschirner (1778–1828), theologian
 August Friedrich Viehweger (1836–1919), architect
 Johann Karl Christoph Vogel (1795–1862), pedagogue, Citizen of Honour of Leipzig
 Georg Voigt (1827–1891), German historian
 Johann Jacob Weber (1803–1880), publisher
 Bernhard Windscheid (1817–1892), legal academic, Citizen of Honour of Leipzig
 Käthe Windscheid (1859–1943), teacher and proponent of women's rights
 Gustav Wohlgemuth (1863–1937), choir conductor and composer
 Bruno Wollstädter (1878–1940), sculptor
 Gustav Wustmann (1844–1910), philologist and historian
 Heinrich Wuttke (1818−1876), German historian
 Friedrich Zarncke (1825–1891), Germanist
 Carl Friedrich Zöllner (1800–1860), composer

Transferred gravestones 
Gravestones and monuments moved from the Neuer to the Alter Johannisfriedhof:

Friedenspark 

The general development plan of 1970 envisaged the conversion of the cemetery into a park for sport and recreation for the students of the  University of Leipzig. This plan was eventually given up in favour of a public park, in order to address the need for recreation and recuperation of the inhabitants of the old housing stock in the neighbouring districts of the Ostvorstadt and Thonberg.

On 20 July 1983 the Friedenspark was declared public property.

Notes and references

Literature 
 Alfred E. Otto Paul: Der Neue Johannisfriedhof in Leipzig, Leipzig 2012, 
 Ein Gang auf den Neuen Friedhof zu Leipzig. In: Die Gartenlaube, year 1860, vol. 16, pp. 244, 245 Wikisource

External links 
 Alfred E. Otto Paul: History of the Neuen Johannisfriedhof in Leipzig 
 Fate of the Neuer Johannisfriedhof 

Parks in Leipzig
Cemeteries in Leipzig